Valley South is a constituency of the Anguillan House of Assembly. The incumbent is Dee-Ann Kentish-Rogers of the Anguilla Progressive Movement.

Representatives

Election results

Elections in the 2020s

|- class="vcard" 
  | style="background-color:"|
  | class="org" style="width: 130px" | AUF
  | class="fn" | Victor Banks
  | style="text-align:right;" | 755
  | style="text-align:right;" | 46.7
  | style="text-align:right;" | -14.0
|-

Elections in the 2010s

Elections in the 2000s

Elections in the 1990s

Elections in the 1980s

External links
Anguillan government election website - constituency results

Constituencies of the Anguillan House of Assembly